The 2022 season was Santos FC's 110th season in existence and the club's sixty-third consecutive season in the top flight of Brazilian football. As well as the Campeonato Brasileiro, the club competes in the Copa do Brasil and the Campeonato Paulista.

Players

Squad information

Source: SantosFC.com.br (for appearances and goals), Wikipedia players' articles (for international appearances and goals), FPF (for contracts). Players in italic were not registered for the Campeonato Paulista.

Copa Sudamericana squad

Source: Santos FC

Appearances and goals

Source: Match reports in Competitive matches, Soccerway

Goalscorers

Source: Match reports in Competitive matches

Disciplinary record

Source: Match reports in Competitive matches
 = Number of bookings;  = Number of sending offs after a second yellow card;  = Number of sending offs by a direct red card.

Suspensions served

Source: Match reports in Competitive matches

Managers

Transfers

Transfers in

Loans in

Transfers out

Loans out

Notes

Competitions

Overview

Campeonato Paulista

Results summary

Group stage

Matches

Copa Sudamericana

Group stage

Round of 16 

The draw for the final stage was held on 27 May 2022.

Campeonato Brasileiro

Results summary

Results by round

League table

Matches

Copa do Brasil

First round

Second round

Third round

Round of 16

References

Notes

External links
Official Site 
Official YouTube Channel 

2022
Santos FC